Water supply and sanitation in the Wellington region involves the provision of the "three waters" – drinking water, stormwater, and wastewater services in the Greater Wellington region.

Water supplies to the Wellington metropolitan area meet the requirements of the Health Act and conform with drinking water standards.  However, for some of the towns in the Kapiti Coast and Wairarapa regions, there have been occasional non-conformances with the required standards for drinking water quality and safety.

The challenges for managing the three waters in the Wellington region include the deteriorated condition of pipelines in the Wellington metropolitan area.  The pipelines are in significantly worse condition than those in other large networks nationwide, and there has been a recent history of serious failures.  The water supply to the region is also at significant risk during a severe earthquake, although some projects are underway to improve resilience.

Asset ownership and service provision

The three waters assets in the Wellington metropolitan area are owned by five councils: Wellington City, Hutt, Upper Hutt and Porirua city councils, and the Greater Wellington Regional Council.  However, the water assets of these councils are managed by an infrastructure asset management company, Wellington Water. From 1 October 2019, Wellington Water also became the asset manager of the water assets of the South Wairarapa District Council.

Wellington Water is jointly owned by all six councils.

The assets in the region covered by these six councils includes 6,300 km of pipes, 138 reservoirs, 249 pump stations and four drinking water treatment plants.

Three waters services for the remaining parts of the Greater Wellington region are provided by the Kapiti Coast District Council, the Carterton District Council and Masterton District Council.

Asset management and investment planning

Benchmarking data published by Water New Zealand as part of their 2018/19 National Performance Review showed that capital expenditure on three waters assets in the Wellington region is well below the average of the expenditure on networks in most other major centres, and for the wastewater network, expenditure was the lowest out of the seven large networks in the review.
 Approximately 200 kilometres of the city's pipes were laid before the outbreak of World War I, and more than half of all the city's pipes will need replacing in the coming three decades. $578 million is required to fix a backlog of existing issues as at 2020. The forecast costs for new investment just to cope with expected population growth range from $2 billion to $4.5 billion.

In a comment about the asset management challenges for the three waters nationwide in February 2020, Water New Zealand’s Technical Manager, Noel Roberts said that problems with wastewater assets in Wellington are not unique to the capital city. He noted that each household in Wellington currently pays $459 a year on wastewater but this is below the national average of $492 per year. Spending on wastewater in Wellington has lagged behind investment in drinking water, particularly with the city’s recent focus on improving resilience.

Wellington city councillors commented at about the same time that the city was already spending a third of its annual budget on water systems. Councillor Sean Rush said that prioritisation of expenditure had to change from age-based replacement to where the consequences of failure would be the worst.

Long term estimates prepared in 2020 for the water infrastructure in Lower Hutt indicated that expenditure of $1.3 billion is required over 30 years to deal with ageing infrastructure. Porirua city may require investment of $1.8 billion over the same period.

In May 2021, the Wellington City Council approved a 10 year plan that included expenditure of $2.7billion on water pipe maintenance and upgrades in Wellington city, and an additional $147 to $208 million for plant upgrades at the Moa Point wastewater treatment plant.

In June 2021, a report released by Wellington Water gave estimates for investments in water infrastructure that could be required to meet forecast population growth to 2050.  The report indicated that total new investment for growth could reach $3.6billion. The estimated cost of upgrade per new dwelling varied widely across the region, from $70,000 to $520,000.

Drinking water

Regional water supply networks

The supply of reticulated drinking water is regulated under the Health Act, and suppliers are registered and subject to a testing regime.  The main registered water suppliers for the Greater Wellington region are  Greater Wellington Regional Council, Wellington City Council, Porirua City Council, Hutt City Council, Upper Hutt City Council, Kapiti Coast District Council.  Masterton District Council, Carterton District Council and South Wairarapa District Council.

Water sources for Wellington metropolitan area
Water supply for the Wellington metropolitan area comes from three sources:

 Te Awa Kairangi / Hutt River
 Wainuiomata and Ōrongorongo rivers
 Waiwhetu aquifer

Up to 150 million litres of water per day may be diverted from the Hutt River, provided an adequate flow is maintained downstream of the weir. The Hutt river water supply provides about 40 percent of the water used in the Wellington metropolitan area each year. There are times each year, particularly during summer months, where the total demand is greater than can be supplied from the three sources.  There are two large storage lakes that can be used to supplement the supply during these periods.

Water sources for remaining areas
The water sources for the South Wairarapa District Council area are the Waiohine catchment for Featherston, the Kuratawhiti Street bore for Greytown residents, and the Herricks bore field for users in Martinborough. Water supplies for the Kapiti Coast region are sourced from combination of bores and surface water from the Waikanae River. Water supply for the Carterton district comes from the Kaipatangata stream and two underground bores. Masterton's drinking water is sourced from the Waingawa River, about 10 km west of Masterton.

Water treatment
The reticulated water supply to the Wellington metropolitan area is all chlorinated. Drinking water in Lower Hutt, Porirua, Upper Hutt and Wellington city is also fluoridated.  The only exceptions are Petone and Korokoro.  These suburbs historically had an unfluoridated water supply and this has continued following a public survey in 2000.

There are four water treatment plants located in the Hutt Valley (Te Mārua, Waterloo, Gear Island and Wainuiomata). These plants supply water for use in Upper Hutt, Lower Hutt, Porirua and Wellington cities. The treatment processes at the four treatment plants differ based on the characteristics of the incoming water.  The Gear Island and Waterloo plants both treat water that is drawn from the Waiwhetu aquifer.

Water supply pipeline age and condition
The 2018/19 National Performance Review published by Water New Zealand compares the average pipeline age and condition across water supply networks. The data for the Wellington water supply network shows that 20% of the pipelines are in poor or very poor condition.  The Wellington network ranks the worst  on this measure out of the six large supply networks nationwide.
The review also includes average pipeline age. The Wellington network has an average age of 43 years, and ranks as the second oldest of the six large supply networks.

Consumption, losses and metering
A National Performance Review published by Water New Zealand for the 2019 financial year showed that daily residential consumption in the Wellington metropolitan region was about 226 litres per person. By way of comparison, daily residential water use in Auckland and Tauranga was significantly lower at about 156 and 189 litres per person respectively. Both Auckland and Tauranga have water metering in place for all residences, but in Wellington only around 1% of residential supplies are currently metered.

Water meters
In March 2020, it was reported that Wellington City Council was considering installing water meters for all domestic consumers. At the time of that report, only 1,200 residential properties in Wellington were using water meters.

In December 2017, the Kapiti Coast District Council reported that there had been a drop in consumption of more than 26% since water meters were installed in July 2014.

Quality and safety
Drinking water is subject to a regime of testing under the Health Act to verify that the water meets standards. Results of compliance testing are published by the Ministry of Health.

Waiwhetu aquifer
Up until late 2016, bores in the Waterloo well field were considered to be secure. However, a rising trend in bacterial count and E.coli detections triggered a review.  At that stage, about half the customers supplied from the Waterloo treatment station received unchlorinated water.

During 2016 and 2017, water supply businesses throughout New Zealand became aware of the severe public health consequences of the Havelock North drinking water contamination incident and the subsequent Government inquiry that recommended all drinking water supplies should be chlorinated.

In 2017, a decision was made by Greater Wellington Regional Council to chlorinate all the water drawn from the Waiwhetu aquifer.

Martinborough
There were two periods during early 2019 when a "boil water" notice was issued to the residents of Martinborough.

Carterton
During March and April 2021, the Carterton District Council issued three separate "boil-water" notices, following the discovery of low levels of E.coli in the town's drinking water.

Resilience

Wellington metropolitan area

The supply of water to the Wellington region is potentially vulnerable to significant disruption in the event of failures caused by a major earthquake.

An application in 2017 by Wellington Water for an easement for a storage reservoir referenced a 2009 study conducted by GNS Science of possible earthquake damage to the water network.  This study estimated that for a magnitude 7.5 Richter scale earthquake, there would be about 30 breaks on the main trunk pipelines and 60 breaks on the smaller branch lines. There could be as many as 8,000 breaks in the Wellington City local supply network. Bulk water supply and treatment facilities are also expected to suffer damage requiring repair. Wellington Water and Greater Wellington Regional Council estimated that it would take around 60‐70 days to restore bulk water supply to parts of the Wellington metropolitan area. It could take several years to fully repair damage to the local water distribution network resulting from a severe earthquake, as much of the network may have to be rebuilt.

A wide range of projects are being undertaken to improve resilience, including the construction of additional reservoirs.

Stormwater

Stormwater pipeline age and condition
The 2018/19 National Performance Review published by Water New Zealand compares the average stormwater pipeline age and condition across networks. The data for the Wellington Water network shows that 16% of the pipelines are in poor or very poor condition.  The Wellington stormwater network ranks the worst on this measure out of the six large networks nationwide.

The review also includes average pipeline age. The Wellington stormwater network has an average age of 49 years, and ranks as the second oldest of the six large networks.

Porirua stormwater improvements
In June 2020, the Porirua City Council announced that work was underway to increase the resilience and capacity of the local stormwater network.  The scope includes the creation of a new wetland.

Wastewater

Properties in urban areas in the Wellington Region are generally all connected to a wastewater system via a gravity sewer.  Pumps are used to supplement the gravity sewers, by pumping wastewater to a treatment plant, or lifting wastewater from lower level drains into a higher elevation gravity sewer so that it can flow to a treatment plant.

Wellington's population grew rapidly in the late 19th century after it became the capital city in 1865. There were increasing cases of typhoid and cholera which were attributed to poor sanitation. In 1879 there were 75 deaths in Wellington from typhoid, diphtheria, scarlet fever, measles and cholera – mostly in the central Te Aro area. After some political deliberation, construction of a city wastewater network began in 1893. It cost £175,000 and was completed by 1899.

There are four separate wastewater catchments in the Wellington metropolitan area:

Wellington city (extending as far north as Johnsonville)
Porirua (from northern Johnsonville to Pukerua Bay)
 Karori
 Hutt valley

The catchments drain mostly via gravity, but there are approximately 170 wastewater pumping stations.

Wastewater treatment 
There are four wastewater treatment plants in the Wellington metropolitan area, one for each of the catchments.

When wastewater networks were first installed, they generally discharged untreated wastewater to the coastal marine environment. Treatment of wastewater in the Wellington metropolitan area began with the installation of fine screening at Seaview and Moa Point in the 1980’s.  A secondary treatment plant for the Porirua catchment was constructed at Titahi Bay in the late 1980’s.  Secondary treatment was installed at Moa Point, Seaview and the Western plant between 1996 and 2002.

Together, the four treatment plants receive about 150 million litres of wastewater on a typical day, using biological and ultraviolet treatment processes. The treated water is discharged to the sea. The sludge resulting from filtration and treatment is de-watered (with this water further treated) and the solid content is sent to landfills. The four wastewater catchment areas for the metropolitan area are:

There are also wastewater treatment plants at Featherston, Greytown, Martinborough and Lake Ferry.

Wastewater pipeline age and condition
The 2018/19 National Performance Review published by Water New Zealand compares the average wastewater pipeline age and condition across networks. The data for the Wellington Water network shows that 33% of the pipelines are in poor or very poor condition. The Wellington wastewater network ranks the worst on this measure out of the six large networks nationwide. (The next worst is Christchurch, with only 12% in poor or very poor condition). The review also includes average pipeline age. The Wellington wastewater network has an average age of 53 years, and ranks as the second oldest of the six large networks.

Wellington city catchment

The interceptor
As part of the early development of the wastewater network, a large pipe was constructed to take wastewater from Manners St through Mt Victoria and out to an ocean outfall at Moa Point on the south coast.  This main trunk wastewater line was known as "the interceptor". In the 1930s the interceptor was extended from Manners St through to Pipitea St, as the city's population topped 100,000. As suburbs spread further north to Johnsonville, another extension of the interceptor was made from Ngauranga Gorge and through Ngaio Gorge to connect at Thorndon.

Moa Point treatment plant
The Moa Point treatment plant handles all the wastewater from most of Wellington city, other than Karori and some northern suburbs. Treated wastewater is discharged via a 1.8 km ocean outfall into Cook Strait. Sludge is separated from the wastewater at the plant, and pumped at high pressure over a  route from Moa Point to the landfill at Carey’s Gully, where it is dewatered and placed into a landfill.

In November 2021, Wellington City Council announced that it was considering installing a new technology thermal drying plant at Moa Point to treat sewage sludge.  The benefits of this project would be to eliminate the current process of pumping sewage sludge from Moa Point to the landfill at Carey’s Gully, and reduce the amount of sludge going into the landfill by 80%. The estimated project cost is in the range $160m – $220m.  The funding of the project is proposed to come from additional levies on residential and commercial properties.

Performance - Wellington catchment 
In March 2020, Wellington Water reported the discovery of severe corrosion in the large main trunk sewer (the interceptor) over a length of 250 m in a section close to the treatment plant near Moa Point. Work commenced on re-lining the affected section of the interceptor in April.

Ōwhiro Bay sewage pollution
Ōwhiro Bay is located on the Wellington south coast.  The shoreline is within the Taputeranga Marine Reserve. There have been persistent problems with sewage pollution of the Ōwhiro Stream and beach for at least ten years, and the beach has been closed for swimming for long periods.

In March 2020, Wellington Water announced that it had found and resolved incorrect connections of wastewater into stormwater systems at five locations in a suburb in the stormwater catchment area of the Ōwhiro Stream.  Wellington Water said that the mistake occurred when the subdivision was built about eight years ago, and there were likely to be more cross-connections that it had yet to identify.

Pipeline collapse in Dixon St
On 20 December 2019, a wastewater pipe built in the 1930s collapsed beneath the intersection of Willis and Dixon Streets in the central business district, leading to the diversion of untreated wastewater into Wellington harbour at an initial rate of up to 100 litres a second. The broken pipe serves much of the central city, taking wastewater to the interceptor (or main trunk sewer), that leads to the Moa Point wastewater treatment plant. The public were warned not to swim in the inner harbour, but local iwi placed a rāhui on the entire Wellington harbour.

An emergency above-ground pipe was placed along Upper Willis street—closing it to all traffic—to bypass the failed underground pipe while permanent repairs were made. The swimming restriction on the whole of Wellington Harbour was lifted on 26 December. However, the area of the inner harbour from the Whairepo Lagoon entrance past the dive platform to the Clyde Quay wharf remained off-limits because of a “separate network issue”.

Willis Street was eventually re-opened at the end of March 2020, after the permanent replacement had been installed beneath the road, and the temporary above-ground pipe removed.

Failure of sludge pipeline beneath Mt Albert
In January 2020, there was a failure of pipelines carrying sludge pumped at high pressure from the Moa Point treatment plant to the landfill at Carey’s Gully.  The pipelines are 9 km long and are about 25 years old.  There are two in parallel allowing one to operate while maintenance can occur on the other pipe.  In this incident both pipes failed at the same time.

To avoid discharging the sludge into the ocean, a fleet of sewage trucks was mobilized to carry about one million litres of sludge a day to the dewatering plant at Carey’s Gully. Up to 150 round trips each day were required, with trucks sometimes operating around the clock to keep up with the volume. Some local residents were impacted by the increased heavy traffic and smells from the trucks.

The break in the pipelines was located 200 m inside a sewage tunnel beneath Mt Albert, making repairs a significant challenge. The repair solution required the manufacture in Germany of a custom-made polyester woven liner.  This liner was winched from one end of each pipe to the other, and then expanded to essentially act as a new pipeline within the old one.  Specialists from the manufacturer flew to New Zealand to assist in the installation, but were required to spend 14 days in isolation because of the border restrictions imposed in response to the COVID-19 pandemic.

In April, the Wellington City Council agreed to borrow $16 million to fund repairs to the sludge pipelines, together with the on-going costs of transporting sludge via truck from the Moa Point treatment facility to the landfill site while the repairs were carried out. On 24 May, Wellington Water announced that the first of the two sludge pipelines had been repaired and put into service, allowing the sludge trucking operations to end.

Porirua catchment
Wastewater from the northern suburbs of Wellington and from Porirua city as far north as Pukerua Bay is treated at a wastewater treatment plant (WWTP) located at Rukutane Point to the south-west of Titahi Bay beach.  There is an ocean outfall adjacent to the plant.  The WWTP was officially opened in September 1989, ending the continuous discharge of untreated wastewater that had occurred at Rukutane Point since the sewage network was constructed in 1951.

The catchment area includes pipe networks owned by Wellington City Council in northern Johnsonville, Paparangi, northern Newlands, Woodridge, Grenada, Churton Park and Tawa.  Sewage mains from the boundary between Wellington and Porirua City Council areas to the treatment plant are jointly owned by the two councils.

Performance - Porirua catchment 
As part of a submission to a Porirua City Council committee in 2018 in relation to renewing resource consents, Wellington Water provided a background document about the issues in the Porirua wastewater system. The issues reported included:
 poor existing freshwater quality in the Porirua catchment
 frequent overflows from wastewater networks into freshwater and coastal water during periods of wet weather, and overflows from the wastewater treatment plant into coastal water
 inflow and infiltration from stormwater into the wastewater network
 ageing network prone to failures and with insufficient capacity to accommodate future growth
 insufficient capacity of the treatment plant to accommodate future growth

Wastewater network overflows during storms 
Discharges from the wastewater network can occur from multiple overflow points in the network.  There are 20 overflow points built into the network.  Discharge of untreated sewage from these overflow points occurs when the total flow exceeds the capacity of pipes and pumping stations, typically during periods of heavy rain or where there is large amounts of infiltration from groundwater.  Wastewater overflows also occur from manholes in some cases. These discharges cause pollution of waterways, harbour, and beaches, and create public health hazards.

In February 2020, the Mayor of Porirua announced the establishment of a roving team to search for issues such as cross connections in stormwater and sewage pipes that contribute to overflows and pollution of waterways.

In August 2021, the Porirua City Council approved a process to designate land adjacent to State Highway 1 and the North Island Main Trunk railway for the construction of a $42.9 million wastewater tank.  The proposed facility will intercept high flows during storms and temporarily store wastewater until it can be pumped to the treatment plant.  This will reduce the risk of overflows from pipes, pumping stations and the wastewater treatment plant. The storage tank is part of the long term strategy for reduction in wastewater overflows published in November 2019.  The strategy includes additional but lower priority storage tanks at north Plimmerton, Paremata, Whitby and north Wellington.

Wastewater pipe failures 
In July 2021, a wastewater main on State Highway 1 failed twice, and another failure occurred when a cross-harbour pipeline was put into service.  These failures led to sewage pollution of Porirua harbour. The initial failure occurred during heavy rain.  Wellington Water said that the pipeline on State Highway 1 was in a fragile condition and a long term fix would take months to complete. Ngāti Toa placed a two-week rāhui on Te Awarua o Porirua.

Illegal discharge from Porirua WWTP
In October 2018, a series of errors and omissions in the management of the Porirua WWTP led to a spill of approximately 5000 cubic metres of wastewater and solids from the outfall at Rukutane Point adjacent to Titahi Bay beach.  In a subsequent hearing in the Environment Court in September 2019, Wellington Water was fined $67,500 for the illegal discharge.

Titahi Bay beach pollution

The maximum hydraulic capacity of the WWTP as at 2020 is 1,000 litres per second. However, peak flows into the plant during storm events in 2018 were recorded at 1,275 litres per second, leading to overflows where some wastewater bypasses some of the treatment stages.  There were 12 such bypass events in 2020.  Each bypass event results in the discharge of some untreated wastewater at the outfall adjacent to Titahi Bay. Planned upgrades to the WWTP would boost capacity to 1,500 litres per second.

Warning signs were posted at Titahi Bay beach in late February 2020, warning against swimming because water quality monitoring had revealed high levels of faecal coliforms. The water at the beach was deemed unsafe for recreational use, including for swimming, fishing or collecting seafood. A further beach closure notice was posted in mid-March 2020.

Wellington Water stated that likely causes such as cross-connections from wastewater to stormwater pipes or damaged pipes provide intermittent flows, so contamination is not constant. As a consequence, some issues can lie undetected for years, while tracking faults can take weeks and sometimes has to be delayed as more urgent repairs take priority. In a statement acknowledging public concern, Wellington Water stated that the recent water quality warning for Titahi Bay beach was not linked in any way to the nearby wastewater treatment plant, and that resolving localised contamination events such as this is the aim of the proposed roving water quality team that Porirua City Council is looking to introduce in the new financial year.

The beach was still considered unsafe for swimming on 30 April 2020. However, Wellington Water reported that they had located a plumbing fault in the catchment feeding into Titahi Bay beach and were working to get this fixed. Titahi Bay beach was closed from February until June 2020 as a result of continuing sewage pollution from multiple sources with levels of E.coli measured at 300 times the level considered safe for swimming.

In January and March 2021, the ultraviolet disinfection stage at the wastewater treatment plant failed, leading to effluent that had not been disinfected being discharged at Rukutane Point.  Local residents including the Tītahi Bay Surf Life Saving Club complained about the failure, and also the lack of warnings given to swimmers.

WWTP discharge consent renewal 2021 
The discharge consent for the Porirua wastewater treatment plant expired on 6 July 2020.  In April 2020, Wellington Water (on behalf of Porirua City Council) submitted an application to Greater Wellington Regional Council (GWRC) for a 20 year renewal of the consent. New consent applications are normally submitted six months before the existing consent expires, but Wellington Water was allowed until 6 April "given the volume and complexity of information" required.  The consent application and supporting documents were published by GWRC in December 2020.  The consent application was formally notified to the public on 25 May 2021, and public submissions closed on 28 July 2021. In November 2021, Wellington Water stated that they had paused the consent application because of performance issues with the wastewater treatment plant.  A webinar was arranged to provide more information for the community about the reasons for the pause.

Long term plan 2021-2051 
In February 2020, Porirua City Council revealed that more than half of Porirua's wastewater pipes are in a poor condition, and that it will cost close to $2 billion over the next two to three decades to bring them up to scratch.

In March 2021, the Porirua City Council published a draft long term plan for the period 2021-2051. In the covering note for the consultation, the Mayor Anita Baker said "There is no greater priority than investing in our critical 3 waters infrastructure - stormwater, wastewater and drinking water". The draft plan included expenditure of $800 million over 30 years on improving water infrastructure, with expenditure on wastewater forecast to be 15% of total rates.

In July 2021, it was announced that the government would provide funding of $136 million from its $3.8 billion Housing Acceleration Fund for upgrading sewerage, stormwater and other water infrastructure in Porirua East.

Karori catchment 
A separate wastewater and treatment system serves the Karori (western) area.  Treated wastewater is piped out to the South Coast.

Hutt valley catchment 
Wastewater from the Wainuiomata valley is piped to the Hutt Valley through the Wainuiomata Tunnel, an abandoned road tunnel that was converted in 1980 to a utilities tunnel.

The Seaview wastewater treatment plant handles wastewater from Upper Hutt and Lower Hutt.  There is an ocean outfall at Pencarrow Head.

In March 2022, Wellington Water reported a leak in the pipeline to the outfall, in the Seaview area.  Repairs required the shutdown of the outfall pipeline, and the discharge of fully treated wastewater into Waiwhetu Stream while the repairs were carried out.

South Wairarapa 
As at May 2022, the wastewater treatment plans serving Featherston, Greytown and Martinborough were all non-compliant, and in need of major investment.

Featherston 
The underground wastewater pipe network in Featherston has significant issues with infiltration of stormwater, and this leads to pollution when there are overflows at the treatment plant. As at 2022, the wastewater scheme for Featherston discharges UV-treated wastewater to Donald's Creek and Lake Wairarapa and is operating under the terms of an extension to an expired resource consent. Lake Wairarapa is part of the Wairarapa Moana Wetlands, recognised in August 2020 as a wetland of international significance under the Ramsar Convention.

As part of efforts to reduce pollution of Lake Wairarapa caused by discharge of wastewater, the South Wairarapa District Council (SWDC) has been exploring alternative options. In 2017, the Council applied to the Greater Wellington Regional Council for resource consent for an alternative including disposal of treated wastewater to land, using irrigation. However, the plan was strongly oppposed by some community groups, and in 2020 the SWDC decided not to proceed with the consent application. In 2022, short-listed options for a long-term solution for wastewater disposal were reported to range in cost from $30 million to  $215 million.

Martinborough
The Martinborough wastewater plant usually discharges treated effluent to land using irrigation, but can also discharge to the Ruamahanga River. Almost half a million litres of partially and fully treated wastewater was discharged into the Ruamahanga River in two incidents in January 2020, as a result of issues at the treatment plant. Under suitable conditions, discharging fully treated wastewater to the river is a consented activity.  However, when the river level is low, as in this case, this type of discharge is a breach of the resource consent.

A report issued in 2022 stated that the scheme was insufficient to meet compliance requirements, with breaches of consent conditions relating to the rate and quality of effluent discharge to both land and water.

Greytown 
The wastewater scheme is designed to discharge to land and to surface water. A report issued in 2022 stated that the scheme was insufficient to meet compliance requirements.

Lake Ferry 
In July 2020, the wastewater system serving the settlement was damaged during forestry operations, and residents were required to restrict wastewater for two days.  The system uses discharge to a field.  No discharge to waterways was reported. The estimated cost of repairs was $327,000.

See also
 Water supply and sanitation in New Zealand
 Water in New Zealand
 Wainuiomata River
 Birchville Dam
 Zealandia - former water catchment and reservoirs

References

External links
 Wellington Water
 Three Waters Review at the Department of Internal Affairs
 Water New Zealand (New Zealand Water and Wastes Association)
 History of our water supply at the Greater Wellington Regional Council
 Wonderful Water Walks – A History of Water Supply Dams in the Wellington Region at the Greater Wellington Regional Council
 Video of Wellington sludge pipeline repair using liner

Water supply and sanitation in New Zealand
Wellington Region